Bernhard Eckstein (21 August 1935 – 10 November 2017) was a German cyclist. In 1960, he won the road race at the world championships and finished in 22nd place in the road race at the 1960 Summer Olympics. During his career he won six one-day races, four in 1958, one in 1960 (the Manx Trophy in the amateurs division), and one in 1966.

References

External links 

1935 births
2017 deaths
People from Nordsachsen
People from the Province of Saxony
German male cyclists
Cyclists from Saxony
Olympic cyclists of the United Team of Germany
Cyclists at the 1960 Summer Olympics
Recipients of the Patriotic Order of Merit in bronze